Maja Hyży, née Krygier (born 3 December 1989 in Kołobrzeg) is a Polish singer. Hyży participated in X Factor where she eventually placed fourth. She has released the music single "Kawa" which peaked at number 7 at the Polish single chart. She participated in the Polish national final for the Eurovision Song Contest 2018 and she took 7th place.

Discography

Albums

Singles

References

Living people
1989 births
Polish singers
People from Kołobrzeg
21st-century Polish singers